"I Just Came to Get My Baby" is a single by American country music artist Faron Young. Released in July 1968, it was the second single from his album Here's Faron Young. The song peaked at number 8 on the Billboard Hot Country Singles chart. It also reached number 1 on the RPM Country Tracks chart in Canada.

Chart performance

References

1968 singles
Faron Young songs
Songs written by Wayne Kemp
1968 songs
Mercury Records singles